Red-handed may refer to:

Animals
 Red-handed howler, New World monkey
 Red-handed tamarin, New World monkey

Expression
 Caught red-handed or In flagrante delicto

Art, entertainment, and media

Television

Music
 Red Handed, one-third member of the hip hop trio 1 Life 2 Live
 "Red-Handed", an episode of the first season of the ABC Television series Once Upon a Time.

Animal common name disambiguation pages

nl:Heterdaad
sv:Bar gärning